John Holder may refer to:
John Holder (cricketer) (born 1945), English former cricketer and umpire
John Holder (bishop) (born 1949), Anglican Archbishop of the West Indies
Ram John Holder (born 1934), British actor
Sir John Charles Holder, 1st Baronet (1838–1923), of the Holder baronets
Sir John Eric Duncan Holder, 3rd Baronet (1899–1986), of the Holder baronets
Sir (John), Henry Holder, 4th Baronet (1928–2020), of the Holder baronets
John N. Holder, associated with Holder Plantation;  longtime owner/editor of The Jackson Herald and candidate for Governor in U.S. state of Georgia

See also 
 John Houlder (1916–2012), British engineer